The FFVS J 22 was a Swedish single-engine fighter aircraft developed for the Swedish Air Force during World War II.

Development
At the onset of World War II, the Swedish Air Force (Flygvapnet) was equipped with largely obsolete Gloster Gladiator (J 8) biplane fighters. To augment this, Sweden ordered 120 Seversky P-35 (J 9) and 144 P-66 Vanguard (J 10) aircraft from the United States. However, on 18 June 1940 after the German occupation of Norway, the United States declared an embargo against exporting weapons to any nation other than Great Britain. As the result, Flygvapnet suddenly faced a shortage of modern fighters. Several other foreign alternatives were considered: the Finnish VL Myrsky and Soviet Polikarpov I-16 were unsatisfactory, and while the Mitsubishi A6M or Aichi D3A was available, delivery from Japan was impractical. A batch of Fiat CR.42 Falco (J 11) biplanes and Reggiane Re.2000 Falco (J 20) were eventually purchased but this was clearly an interim solution.

With Flygvapnet facing a serious shortage of aircraft and Saab running at full capacity building its single-engine Saab 17 and twin-engined Saab 18 bombers, a new firm and factory were established specifically for the new fighter — Kungliga Flygförvaltningens Flygverkstad i Stockholm ("Royal Air Administration Aircraft Factory in Stockholm", FFVS) under Bo Lundberg. The aircraft, designated J 22, was a monoplane with a plywood-covered steel airframe. Wing and fuselage layout were conventional, with the narrow-track main landing gear retracting rearward entirely within the fuselage. Power came from a Swedish copy of the Pratt & Whitney R-1830 Twin Wasp, manufactured without a license at the time, though license fees were paid later (a symbolic US$1).

The J 22 first flew on 20 September 1942 from Bromma airport, where the factory was located. It entered service in October 1943, at the F9 air wing at Gothenburg, with the last of the 198 aircraft delivered in April 1946. Sub-assemblies for the J 22 were made by over 500 different contractors.

Operational history

The J 22 was well liked by its pilots and possessed good manoeuvrability and responsive controls. Forward visibility on the ground left something to be desired and if the tailwheel was left unlocked and able to swivel during take-off there was the potential to ground-loop. In mock dogfights with P-51 Mustangs (called J 26 in Swedish service) it was able to "hold its own" up to 5,000 metres (16,000 ft) although, above 6,000 m (19,000 ft), without a good high altitude supercharger, it became sluggish. J 22 pilot Ove Müller-Hansen: "This was one of the finest aircraft that I have ever flown. The responsiveness of the controls and overall handling was exceptionally nice. It was not a high altitude fighter but up to about 5000 m (16,000 ft) it could hold its own very well. We flew mock dog fights with P-51 Mustangs and they could not catch us below 4000 m (13,000 ft) but if the fight was higher than that we had to be very careful. At altitudes above 6000 m (19,500 ft) it was getting sluggish and at 9000 m (29,000 ft) it was not much power left. Stalls in turns and straight forward were usually not a problem. If you pulled really hard in turn it would sometime flip over on its back. The first version, the 22-A, did not have much fire power, but the 22-B was better." Because of its simple systems the J 22 was very easy to maintain and service.

With 575 km/h (360 mph) from a 795 kW (1,065 hp) engine, the press called the diminutive fighter "World's fastest in relation to the engine power" (while not absolutely true, it was in the same class as the early marks of Supermarine Spitfire and Zero). The J 22 crews promptly modified this to "World's fastest in relation to the track width" (for which the Spitfire might also have competed), because of the very narrow wheel track. The aircraft was retired in 1952.

Variants
 J 22-1 or J 22A 
 Originally called J 22 UBv "Ursprunglig Beväpning" (original armament). First production version, 2x 8 mm and 2x 13.2 mm machine guns, 141 built.
 J 22-2 or J 22B 
 Originally called J 22 FBv "Förbättrad Beväpning" (improved armament). Armed with 4x 13.2 mm machine guns, 57 built. 
 S 22-3 or S 22
 Nine J 22-1 equipped for reconnaissance in 1946, restored to fighters in 1947. Used a spaningskamera Ska4 (recce camera Ska4) in the tail.

Operators
  Sweden
 Swedish Air Force

Surviving aircraft
Three examples of the J 22 are preserved externally complete looking. Two are owned by the Swedish air force museum and one of them is on static display there with the other one being located at a nearby veteran airfield where it is able to taxi around by its own power. The third one is owned by Svedinoes bil- och flygmuseum but is currently in France being borrowed by a plane restoration company named Memorial flight so they can restore it to flying condition. Two more J 22 survive but are much less complete, and are for the most part just metal skeletons. One is owned by the Swedish air force museum with the other one being owned privately. They are planned to be combined with each other and restored to flying condition.

The aircraft in the heading photograph is in the markings of Östgöta Wing (F 3), code 'L' and is displayed in the Flygvapenmuseum at Malmen near Linköping.

Specifications (J 22A)

See also

References

Notes

Bibliography

 Andersson, Hans G. SAAB Aircraft since 1937; 2nd revised edition. London: Putnam Aeronautical books, 1997.  (Note: Although dedicated to SAAB aircraft, this book has a chapter on the FFVS J 22.)
 Angelucci, Enzo. The Rand McNally Encyclopedia of Military Aircraft, 1914–1980. San Diego, California: The Military Press, 1983. .
 Donald, D, Lake J. (eds.) (1996) Encyclopedia of World Military Aircraft. AIRtime Publishing.

External links

  IPMS Stockholm's J22 "walkaround" photo series
 J-22 history, technical data, fighter comparisons, colours and markings Retrieved: 23 June 2008

1940s Swedish fighter aircraft
Single-engined tractor aircraft
Aircraft first flown in 1942